El Sfar Mosque, was a Tunisian mosque located in the medina of Tunis.
It does not exist anymore.

Localization
The mosque was located on Sidi Sourdou Street.

History
The saint Mohammed Ben Ali Sourdou, also known as Sidi Sourdou (died 1873), used to pray in this mosque.

References 

Mosques in Tunis